Kenya made its Paralympic Games début at the 1972 Summer Paralympics. It was absent in 1976, but returned to the 1980 Summer Games and has competed in every edition of the Summer Paralympics since then. It has never competed at the Winter Paralympics.

Kenyans have won a total of thirty-six Paralympic medals: fourteen gold, thirteen silver and nine bronze. All but one of these medals have been in track and field. This puts Kenya in 49th place on the all-time Paralympic Games medal table.

Medal tables

Medals by Summer Games

Medals by Summer Sport 
Source:

Medalists

See also
 Kenya at the Olympics

References